was a Japanese diplomat. During the 1960s he served as 2nd Secretary of the Japanese Embassy in the Netherlands.

Biography
He served as the last Japanese Ambassador to Czechoslovakia prior to its breakup and the first Ambassador to the Czech Republic. Also served as Japanese Ambassador to Guyana, and in that capacity concluded on November 24, 1995 an agreement between the two countries providing for Japanese assistance in the improvement of electric infrastructures in Guyana.  Also, he was an Ambassador to Vietnam, Venezuela, and Suriname.

Retirement
Following his retirement from the Japanese Ministry of Foreign Affairs, joined the board of directors of the international humanitarian organization Japan Platform. Also joined The Japan Center for Preventive Diplomacy.

Now, he is a professor of North Asia University in Akita.

See also
List of ambassadors of Japan to Czechoslovakia and the Czech Republic

References

Living people
20th-century Japanese people
Ambassadors of Japan to Czechoslovakia
Ambassadors of Japan to the Czech Republic
Ambassadors of Japan to Guyana
Year of birth missing (living people)
Place of birth missing (living people)